O-1812 is an eicosanoid derivative related to anandamide that acts as a potent and highly selective agonist for the cannabinoid receptor CB1, with a Ki of 3.4 nM at CB1 and 3870 nM at CB2. Unlike most related compounds, O-1812 is metabolically stable against rapid breakdown by enzymes, and produces a cannabinoid-like discriminative effect in rats, which is similar but not identical to that produced by cannabinoid drugs of other chemical classes.

See also
 AM-1235
 AM-2232
 AM-2389
 Methanandamide
 O-774
 O-1057

References

Cannabinoids
Nitriles
Fatty acid amides